The Davies Bridge carries Red Bluff Drive across Cedar Creek, just north of Arkansas Highway 154 in Petit Jean State Park, Arkansas. It is built out of mortared ashlar fieldstone laid in courses, with some stones left rusticated and protruding from the sides. The bridge was built in 1934 by a crew of the Civilian Conservation Corps that was developing the park's facilities.

The bridge was listed on the National Register of Historic Places in 1990.

See also
List of bridges documented by the Historic American Engineering Record in Arkansas
List of bridges on the National Register of Historic Places in Arkansas
National Register of Historic Places listings in Conway County, Arkansas

References

External links

Road bridges on the National Register of Historic Places in Arkansas
Bridges completed in 1934
Transportation in Conway County, Arkansas
Historic American Engineering Record in Arkansas
National Register of Historic Places in Conway County, Arkansas
Morrilton, Arkansas
Individually listed contributing properties to historic districts on the National Register in Arkansas
Stone arch bridges in the United States
1934 establishments in Arkansas
Civilian Conservation Corps in Arkansas